Leymus salina is a species of grass known as Salina wildrye, Salina Pass wild rye, and saline wildrye. It is native to the western United States and is named for its type locality: Salina Pass, Utah.

Subspecies
There are three subspecies, including:
Leymus salina subsp. salina
Leymus salina subsp. mojavensis – Mojave wildrye
Leymus salina subsp. salmonis – salmon wildrye

Description
Salina pass wild rye is a perennial grass forming dense clumps of stems up to 1.4 meters in height. It sometimes has rhizomes. The leaves are mostly located around the bases of the stems. The inflorescence is a spike with spikelets mostly solitary or sometimes paired. Each spikelet contains up to 6 flowers.

Habitat
This plant grows in a number of habitat types in the western United States. It is sometimes a dominant species in pinyon-juniper woodlands and Gambel oak woodlands. In Colorado it is often codominant with Wyoming big sagebrush, shadscale, and Gardner's saltbush.

References

salina
Grasses of the United States
Endemic flora of the United States